Vengeance Is Mine, All Others Pay Cash is a 2021 Indonesian black comedy action drama film directed by Edwin who also co-wrote the screenplay with Eka Kurniawan based on Kurniawan's best-selling book of the same name. The film had its world premiere in August 2021 at the 74th Locarno Film Festival, where it won the top prize of Golden Leopard for Best Film.

Edwin won his second Best Director nod at the 42nd Citra Awards, where the film won a total of 5 awards out of 12 nominations.

Plot 
Set in the 1980s in a society ruled by machismo, a hibernating "bird" becomes a serious matter. In a life of brutality, the sleeping bird is an allegory for a peaceful and serene life, even when the whole world tries desperately to rouse it.

Cast 
These are the cast members of the film as announced by Palari Films in July 2021:

Production

Development 
In May 2016, Palari Films announced that they had secured the rights to adapt Eka Kurniawan's third novel Vengeance Is Mine, All Others Pay Cash with Edwin on board to direct alongside collaborators Muhammad Zaidy and Meiske Taurisia as producers. However, as the efforts to adapt the novelproved to be more challenging than expected, Edwin proposed to Palari Films that they pursue another project together while working on the adaptation, which turned out to be Laksmi Pamuntjak's 2014 novel The Birdwoman's Palate, leading to Edwin's 2018 feature Aruna & Her Palate.

To raise funds for the film, the film script was submitted to compete in international grant competitions as the production team believed it has an international appeal. In 2016, the script won a US$15,000 grant for winning the Most Promising Project Award at the Asian Project Market held during the 2016 Busan International Film Festival in South Korea. In 2018, it received a post-production grant from the post-production lab White Light Post at the Hong Kong Asian Film Financing Forum as well as a co-production grant from the Singapore Film Commission. It also received another production grant from Bangkok-based Purin Pictures.

Casting 
The film marks the return of Edwin's frequent collaborator Ladya Cheryl to the big screen since her last appearance in a feature film in 2012's Postcards from the Zoo, also directed by Edwin. In an interview with The Hollywood Reporter, Edwin said that Cheryl's portrayal of Iteung is inspired by 80's action star Cynthia Rothrock. Singer-songwriter Sal Priadi makes his feature film debut alongside Ratu Felisha and Citra Award winner Reza Rahadian in supporting roles.

Release 
In July 2021, Variety reported that art house agency The Match Factory had acquired the film's distribution rights. The film had its world premiere at the 74th Locarno Film Festival on 8 August 2021, where it won the Golden Leopard. The film screened in the Contemporary World Cinema section of the 46th Toronto International Film Festival. It was screened at the Filmfest Hamburg and 26th Busan International Film Festival in October 2021. Vengeance Is Mine, All Others Pay Cash was also screened at the BFI London Film Festival 2021 during the Dare section.

The film was released theatrically in Indonesia on 2 December 2021.

Reception

Box office 
Vengeance Is Mine, All Other Pay Cash recorded a total of 85,004 admissions throughout its theatrical release in Indonesia, ranking it in the 11th spot among all domestic productions released in 2021.

Critical response 
Writing for Variety, Jay Weissberg wrote that the film "delivers a withering critique of masculinity" while managing to be "enjoyable". However, Weissberg was critical of the screenplay, noting that Edwin and co-writer Kurniawan "cram rather too many meandering plot lines". Also for Variety, Diego Cepeda and Calin Boto called the film "a genre-bending portrayal of an angry impotent young man stuck in the middle of the macho Indonesian Eighties", referring to the film's main character Ajo Kawir and heavy influence of 80's pop culture. Marta Balaga of Cineuropa praised the film's "central romance" between Ajo Kawir and Iteung as "the most fun to watch", singling out Cheryl’s portrayal of Iteung as a stand-out. Similar to Weissberg, Balaga also criticized the film's editing, calling it "very uneven, going from funny to dark to just weird, as if the editing couldn’t keep up with the ongoing brainstorming session".

Awards and nominations

References

External links
 

2021 action drama films
Films based on Indonesian novels
Indonesian action drama films
2021 films

2020s Indonesian-language films